Federal Compulsory Medical Insurance Fund (FFOMS) is one of the state extra-budgetary funds (i.e. fund is not a part of federal or regional budgets) established to finance medical services to Russian citizens. Created on February 24, 1993, by decision of the Supreme Soviet of the RSFSR No. 4543-I.

The activities of the fund are governed by the Budget Code of Russia and the Russian law entitled "On Compulsory Health Insurance in the Russian Federation", and other laws and regulations. Among the key features of the fund:

Leveling the activity of territorial compulsory medical insurance funds for financing the program of compulsory health insurance.
Funding targeted programs under the Compulsory Health Insurance.
Control over rational use of funds of compulsory health insurance

Heads
Grishin, Vladimir (1993–1998)
Taranov, Andrei (1998–2006)
Reyhart, Dmitry (Acting, 2006–2008)
Jurin, Andrei (2008–2012)
Stadchenko, Natalia (2012–2020)
Chernyakova, Elena (2020–2022)
Balanin, Ilya (2022–present)

See also
 Health care systems by country#Russia
 Healthcare in Russia

References

External links 
 Official website 

Healthcare in Russia
Social security in Russia
Economy of Russia
Taxation in Russia
Health insurance
Health economics